Najah Chouaya (born January 10, 1988) is a Tunisian runner and Paralympic athlete. She won a silver medal for Tunisia at the 2016 Summer Paralympics in the Women's 1500 metres - T13.

Biography
Chouaya was born on January 10, 1988, in Gabes, Tunisia, with congenital blindness.

Career

2006 IPC Athletics World Championships
At the 2006 IPC Athletics World Championships in Assen, Chouaya participated in three events. On September 4, she competed the 200 metres in 27.12 seconds, placing sixth. On September 6, she came fourth in the 100 metres with a time of 13.42 seconds. Her final event was the 400 metre-race on September 8, where she placed eighth with a time of 59.92 seconds.

2016 Paralympic Games
On September 10, 2016, Chouaya participated at the 2016 Summer Paralympics in Rio de Janeiro as one of thirty-one athletes competing for Tunisia. She came second in the Women's 1500 metres - T13 event, winning the silver medal with a time of 4:30.52. Chouaya was second to fellow Tunisian athlete Soumaya Bousaid, who won gold.

2017 World Para Athletics Championships
On July 14, 2017, Chouaya competed at the 2017 World Para Athletics Championships in London in the Women's 1500 metres - T13. She won bronze with a time of 4:46.16, a season's best for her. She came behind Bousaid in second and Sanaa Benhama in first.

References

External links 
 

1988 births
Living people
Tunisian female sprinters
Paralympic athletes of Tunisia
Paralympic athletes with a vision impairment
Paralympic medalists in athletics (track and field)
Paralympic silver medalists for Tunisia
Athletes (track and field) at the 2016 Summer Paralympics
Medalists at the 2016 Summer Paralympics
People from Gabès
Tunisian female middle-distance runners
21st-century Tunisian women